Bjarte Engeset (born 25 August 1958 in Ørsta) is a Norwegian classical conductor.

Biography and career 

Bjarte Engeset studied music at the University of Georgia, Grieg Akademiet in Norway, and Sibelius Academy in Finland, in 1988, with Jorma Panula. He then spent the summer of 1989 at the Tanglewood Music Center Seminar of Conductors, studying with Seiji Ozawa, Gustav Meier, Simon Rattle, Marek Janowski and others.

Engeset has been Music Director of Tromsø Symphony Orchestra and The Norwegian Wind Ensemble, artistic director of Northern Norway's Northern Lights Festival and the Opera Nord, and permanent guest conductor of the Flemish Radio Orchestra. Since 2007 Engeset has been Chief Conductor and Artistic Director of Sweden’s DalaSinfonietta. He has toured widely, in Scandinavia, Britain, Germany, Belgium, the Czech Republic, Romania, Slovakia, Estonia and the United States. He has performed with many orchestras, including the Baltimore Symphony, Bergen Philharmonic, Bournemouth Symphony, Moscow Radio Symphony Orchestra, Malmø Symphony, NDR Philharmonic Orchestra, Washington NGA Symphony Orchestra, Oslo Philharmonic, Royal Scottish National Orchestra, St. Petersburg Philharmonic, and others.

Engeset has recorded several dozen CDs, for the Naxos, EMI, Klara and cpo labels. In particular, he has made many recordings of music by Scandinavian composers, such as Grieg, Sibelius and Tveitt.

Honors 
1996: Nordlysprisen

References

External links
 Official website 
 Bjarte Engeset's biography on his management's website
 Bjarte Engeset's biography and discography on the Naxos website

1958 births
Living people
Norwegian conductors (music)
Male conductors (music)
People from Ørsta
University of Georgia alumni
21st-century conductors (music)
21st-century Norwegian male musicians